Olena Burkovska (born on 9 August 1981 in Yahotyn, Kyiv Region) is Ukrainian long-distance runner who competes in marathons.

She won the 86th Košice Peace Marathon on her debut over the distance. She broke the course record setting the time 2:30:50. Burkovska’s performance sliced 38 seconds from the 2:31:28 record set by Czech Alena Peterkova in 1989. At the 2010 Nagano Olympic Commemorative Marathon she finished second behind Lisa Jane Weightman, recording a time of 2:31:53.

She placed fifth at the 2010 Berlin Marathon and managed 21st place at the 2011 World Championships in Athletics. Burkovska finished 48th at the 2012 London Olympics. She broke the course record at the Hannover Marathon in 2013, completing the distance in 2:27:07 hours. On 16 November 2014, Burkovska came third at the Istanbul Marathon in 2:31:32 hours.

References

External links

 IAAF News release Sunday, 4 October 2009

1981 births
Living people
People from Yahotyn
Ukrainian female long-distance runners
Ukrainian female marathon runners
Athletes (track and field) at the 2012 Summer Olympics
Olympic athletes of Ukraine
Sportspeople from Kyiv Oblast